Lentinula lateritia is a species of agaric fungus in the family Omphalotaceae. It is found in  South-east Asia and Australasia, except for New Zealand. Originally described by Miles Joseph Berkeley in 1881 as a species of Agaricus, it was transferred to the genus Lentinula in 1983 by David Pegler.

References

External links

Fungi described in 1881
Fungi of Asia
Fungi of Australia
Taxa named by Miles Joseph Berkeley